John Crist may refer to:
 John Crist (athlete) (born 1954), American former decathlete
 John Crist (comedian), (born 1984), American comedian